{{Speciesbox
| image =
| status = EX
| status_system = IUCN2.3
| status_ref = 
| genus = Athearnia
| species = crassa
| authority = (Haldeman, 1841)
| synonyms = Leptoxis crassa
}}Athearnia crassa'', the boulder snail, was a species of freshwater snail in the family Pleuroceridae. It was native to the United States, where it was known from Alabama, Georgia, Tennessee, and Virginia. It is now extinct.

References

Molluscs of the United States
Pleuroceridae
Extinct gastropods
Gastropods described in 1841
Taxa named by Samuel Stehman Haldeman
Taxonomy articles created by Polbot